Overwatch is a multimedia franchise centered on a series of online multiplayer first-person shooter (FPS) video games developed by Blizzard Entertainment: Overwatch released in 2016, and Overwatch 2 released in 2022. Both games feature hero-based combat between two teams of players vying over various objectives, along with other traditional gameplay modes. With the launch of Overwatch 2, the roster of selectable heroes has grown to 35.

Released in 2016, the first video game in the series lacked a traditional story mode. Instead, Blizzard employed a transmedia storytelling strategy to disseminate lore regarding the game's characters, releasing comics and other literary media, as well as animated media that includes short films. The game enjoyed both critical and commercial success, and garnered a devoted following. In addition to more traditional fan art, the game also spawned fan-produced pornographic content which attracted considerable media attention.

Blizzard helped launch and promote an esports scene surrounding the game, including an annual Overwatch World Cup, as well as a league and its developmental minor league, which borrowed elements found in traditional American sports leagues. In 2022, a sequel was released.

Premise

Omnic Crisis
Overwatch is set sixty years into the future of a fictionalized Earth, as well as thirty years after the "Omnic Crisis" is resolved and six years after the Petras Act is signed.

Omnics are artificial intelligence (AI) robots that were created to assist humans in manufacturing and global economic equality efforts. During this period, humanity prospered as omnics helped stabilize society. 

The Omnic Crisis involved "omniums" (large facilities that churned out omnics) beginning to produce hostile omnics, many of which were bastion units. These hostile omnics began attacking humans, beginning their assault in Russia. Individual nations initially responded to the crisis with their own programs. The United States launched the secret Soldier Enhancement Program, modifying soldiers into mercenaries. Jack Morrison and Gabriel Reyes were among the most notable test subjects of the program. Meanwhile, Germany responded to the crisis through the Crusaders, an elite force of soldiers heavily suited in armor inspired by knights and wielding weapons such as hammers. The Crusaders were led by Balderich von Adler, until he handed the reins to a young Reinhardt Willhelm following a battle in Eichenwalde.

Removed from the crisis, scientists on the moon-based Horizon Lunar Colony create genetically modified animals to test long-term habitation in space. Among these animals is an ape named Winston. Other apes on the colony start a revolt, killing all scientists in the process. However, Winston creates a rocket and escapes to Earth.

While Russia opted to handle the waves of omnics on their own, nations failed to quell the crisis individually. As a result, the United Nations (UN) assembled Overwatch, a strike team led by Reyes and Morrison. Reyes served as Overwatch's Strike Commander, leading the task force that included Morrison, Wilhelm, Egyptian sniper Ana Amari, Swedish weapons engineer Torbjörn Lindholm, and Singaporean AI scientist Dr. Mina Liao. Within a few years, the Omnic Crisis was declared over and Overwatch transitioned toward being a peacekeeping organization.

Overwatch Generation and Blackwatch
After the end of the crisis, an ensuing golden age of heroism and global peace was dubbed the "Overwatch Generation". Despite this, separate human–omnic conflicts sprung up in Korea and Australia. Meanwhile, the Indian-based Vishkar Corporation developed a technology that allowed its users, or "architechs", to create physical objects with light. Vishkar took this technology to Rio de Janeiro and while initially well-intentioned, the corporation began to abuse Rio's population. A group of omnics called the Shambali also emerged. Led by Tekhartha Mondatta, they believe that omnics possess a soul and aim to revitalize human–omnic relations.

A growing rift between Morrison and Reyes arose after the former was promoted to Strike Commander. After Reyes lost command of Overwatch, he took control of Blackwatch, a covert operations unit. American bounty hunter Cole Cassidy, Irish geneticist Moira O'Deorain, and Japanese cyborg ninja Genji Shimada joined as members of Blackwatch. The latter was part of the eponymous Shimada Clan crime family alongside his brother, Hanzo. After a falling out, the family ordered Hanzo to kill Genji. On the brink of death, Genji was rehabilitated into a cyborg by Overwatch medical director Angela Ziegler.

Fall of Overwatch
A terrorist organization, Null Sector, meanwhile emerges in London. Lacking rights in England, omnics are forced to live in the Underworld, a city beneath the streets of London. Composed of these omnics facing persecution following the Omnic Crisis' conclusion, Null Sector launches a surprise attack on King's Row. Dismissing orders from the British Prime Minister, Morrison deploys Overwatch agents Wilhelm, Lindholm, Ziegler, and the newly-recruited Lena Oxton on an ultimately successful mission to stop Null Sector's forces.

Blackwatch is enlisted to fight against Talon, a terrorist threat seeking to set off another crisis. While in Italy on a covert operation to kidnap Talon's leader, Reyes ultimately kills him, exposing Blackwatch to the public. Public distrust in the organization begins to swell and the UN launches an investigation into Blackwatch following their fiasco in Italy. Already in a strained relationship, Morrison and Reyes find themselves at further odds with each other as a result. An argument between the two at Overwatch's headquarters in Switzerland ends in an explosion, after which both are presumed dead. 

After these events, the UN signed the Petras Act, outlawing any further activity by Overwatch. As any other action would be deemed illegal, Overwatch disbanded.

Both Morrison and Reyes end up surviving, however. Morrison begins a vigilante crusade under the name Soldier: 76 against Overwatch's former enemies. Reyes is able to render himself temporarily incorporeal as a result of a life-saving procedure conducted by O'Deorain. Now operating under the name Reaper, Reyes joins Talon.

Recall 
Six years after the Petras Act is signed, a second Omnic Crisis emerges in Russia. Staying at Watchpoint, a former Overwatch facility based in Gibraltar, Winston follows the developing situation. Reaper then breaks into Watchpoint and attacks Winston. While Winston is able to thwart Reaper, the latter's attack is the catalyst for the former's issuing of a recall of former Overwatch agents. Oxton, known by the call sign Tracer, is the first to answer; she is later followed by Genji, Wilhelm, Lindholm, Cassidy, and Ziegler, known by the call sign Mercy. 

After the recall, Reaper and Talon sniper Amélie Lacroix (known as Widowmaker) attempt to steal a gauntlet for their leader Akande Ogundimu. They are stopped by Winston and Oxton, known by the call sign Tracer. Widowmaker later assassinates Mondatta as he gives a speech in London.

Development

Prior to the original game's announcement, Blizzard had been interested in making a team-based multiplayer shooter for a while. Overwatch has its development origins rooted in Titan, a Blizzard project that was cancelled in 2013. Elements of Titan were reworked into Overwatch, which was announced at BlizzCon in November 2014. Overwatch became Blizzard's first new series since they launched Diablo in 1996, as well as their first attempt at making an FPS game. After the game's announcement, Polygon wrote that it "appears to feature Blizzard's signature chunky, slightly cartoonish style." A beta for the game was launched in 2015. 

Jeff Kaplan, Michael Chu, and Scott Mercer served as the game's lead director, lead writer, and principal game designer, respectively. Blizzard hired writer Alyssa Wong to Overwatchs writing team in 2018. Kaplan departed from Blizzard in April 2021, after which Aaron Keller took over Kaplan's duties as lead director.

After the release of Overwatch, Blizzard's developers continued to add to the game through free updates, introducing new characters, maps, game modes, and cosmetic items, often as part of seasonal events. The different gameplays of individual heroes were also tuned and patched in response to player feedback and statistics regarding the meta found within the game. As Kaplan followed a philosophy that emphasized players' perception of game balance, he affirmed that meta shifts to Overwatch were beholden to its players and not its developers; Heroes Never Die wrote on Kaplan's belief that if the community thought Overwatchs meta was broken, then it actually was and vice versa.

Games

Overwatch series

The original Overwatch game was released by Blizzard on May 24, 2016, for PC platforms, as well as eighth generation console platforms PlayStation 4 and Xbox One. A version of the game developed by Iron Galaxy for the Nintendo Switch was later released on October 15, 2019. Blizzard shut down servers for the game on October 3, 2022. 

Blizzard released Overwatch 2 via early access on October 4, 2022. The game was made free-to-play on PC and for the PlayStation 5 and Xbox Series S/X platforms, and employed full cross-platform play.

Heroes of the Storm crossover

Until the warm reception of Overwatchs beta, Blizzard was unsure of representing Overwatch characters in Heroes of the Storm, their crossover multiplayer battle online arena (MOBA) video game. Around a month prior to the release of Overwatch, Blizzard added Tracer to the MOBA; PC Gamer called Tracer's addition to the game "a marketing move [for Overwatch], for sure." Afterwards, other characters and map elements from Overwatch were incorporated into Heroes. By the time the game transitioned to a permanent maintenance mode in July 2022, a total of nine characters became playable in Heroes of the Storm, while battlegrounds based on the Overwatch maps Hanamura and Volskaya Industries were also included. A number of Overwatch-themed skins have been introduced for Heroes of the Storms "Overwatch cosplay" event in May 2021.

Esports

While not originally developed with esport support in mind, Overwatch would see a considerable esport scene prop up around the franchise shortly after its first game's release. According to Kaplan, although Blizzard had success with committing to esports while developing Starcraft II, they found "it's dangerous to be overly committed to esport too early in the lifespan of the game." To avoid sacrificing approachability as they did with Starcraft II, Blizzard opted to gauge how the Overwatch community would develop around esports over time as they did with Hearthstone. This included the introduction of the game's competitive mode some months after the game's launch after seeing how players took towards Overwatch; Blizzard saw the ladder-approach they used as a means for skilled players to reach high ranks as to be noticed by esport team organizers. ESPN and Gamasutra wrote that the game had a favorable foundation to succeed as an esports title, citing the game's sufficient difference from established esports games, its variety in maps and characters, and strong support from its developer, as well as its speed and short match times.

The first organized, prize-winning competitions for Overwatch started in mid-2016, a few months after launch. The esports organizer ESL held the first international Overwatch competition in August 2016, dubbed the Overwatch Atlantic Showdown. The competition used four open qualifiers beginning in June, followed by regional qualifiers and then a final online qualifier. Eight teams then competed for a six-figure prize in the finals to be held at Gamescom 2016 from August 20 to 21. Turner Broadcasting's ELeague announced the first Overwatch Open tournament, starting in July 2016, with a total prize pool of $300,000, with plans to broadcast the finals on Turner's cable channel TBS in September 2016. 

Blizzard announced its own official Overwatch World Cup (OWWC) tournament in August 2016. The first annual OWWC would be played later that November at BlizzCon 2016, where Blizzard also announced the formation of their Overwatch League (OWL). 

The OWL borrowed various elements from traditional sports leagues like the National Football League (NFL), including a developmental league called Overwatch Contenders (OWC). The OWL also implemented permanent teams organized in league placements rather than the use of promotion and relegation. The OWL secured billionaire sports team owners to become OWL team owners and established 12 franchises around the world by September 2017, with plans to expand further in later seasons. Contracted players on these franchises are guaranteed a minimum salary, benefits, and revenue sharing. Preseason games for the inaugural OWL season took place in December 2017. The first OWL regular season game was played between the Los Angeles Valiant and San Francisco Shock to a sold out crowd at Blizzard Arena in January 2018. To support viewership of its professional competitions, Blizzard released a companion Overwatch application in November 2018, which allowed viewers to watch matches through a spectator mode.

Overwatch achieved a high level of popularity as an esport in South Korea, with the first game surpassing League of Legends and topping gaming cafés in the country in terms of player count. The game also influenced the creation of an esports tournament in the region, under the brand name "APEX", which operated until January 2018.

Other media
Overwatch was developed to lack a traditional story or campaign mode and instead Blizzard conveyed narrative elements through a transmedia storytelling method. While voice lines and map elements in Overwatch reveal some of its universe's lore, the bulk of the story surrounding its characters is told through animated short films and literary media. Character biographies and fake news reports containing story pieces have also been published on Blizzard's website. Chu remarked that Blizzard's method of storytelling with Overwatch demonstrated a "gameplay first" philosophy.

Animations

As part of the original game's announcement, Blizzard released an animated "cinematic trailer" for Overwatch on November 7, 2014. They would repeat this to announce Overwatch 2, releasing the Zero Hour cinematic trailer in 2019.

Blizzard also released animated short films to help flesh out "the real meat" of Overwatchs lore. These shorts employed 3D computer-generated animation, and received praise from video game journalists, with some likening their quality to those of works from Disney and Pixar. that Recall, the first of these shorts, was released on March 21, 2016. It was centered around Reaper's attack on Winston at Gibraltar and Winston's following recall of former Overwatch agents. Blizzard released nine more shorts through 2018; Reunion was the last of these shorts until The Wastelander was released in 2022.

Aside from short films, Blizzard also released "origin story" videos for Soldier: 76 and each character added to Overwatchs playable roster post-launch. An origin story for King's Row Uprising, a tie-in for an in-game event was also released. These origin story videos are designed to provide players with the background of new characters. Origin stories are animated in the style of motion comics and are shorter than Blizzard's 3D-animated short films.

Comics
From 2016 to 2018, Blizzard published Overwatch, a 16-issue comic series, beginning with "Trainhopper". Some issues, such as "Uprising", served as tie-ins to in-game events. Motion comic versions of the series were also released, produced by Madefire Studios. These motion comics included sound effects and official music featured in-game. Originally a digital comic series, Blizzard partnered with Dark Horse Comics to publish a hardcover anthology in 2017, which collected the series' 12 issues released to that point. An expanded edition of the anthology was released in December 2021.

From 2020 to 2021, Blizzard and Dark Horse published Tracer - London Calling a five-issue limited series. Written by Mariko Tamaki and illustrated by Babs Tarr, print versions of each issue were also released. Rachael Cohen and Deron Bennett served as the series' colorist and letterer, respectively. A graphic novel collecting the five issues and featuring cover art by artist Bengal was physically released on September 28, 2021.

Another five-issue limited series, New Blood was released from November 2021 to March 2022. Similar in style to London Calling, the series followed Cassidy post-Zero Hour on his journey to recruit members to the newly revived Overwatch. Both London Calling and New Blood also served as tie-ins for in-game seasonal events.

Other literary media
A graphic novel titled Overwatch: First Strike was teased by Blizzard in 2016, but it was ultimately scrapped. Posting on Overwatchs official forums, Chu stated that Blizzard decided to cancel First Strike due to considerable changes made to the narrative and characters of Overwatch since First Strike was first conceived. The novel was to be penned by writer Micky Neilson and artist Ludo Lullabi.

Shortly before the publishing of the first volume of their Overwatch comic series anthology, Dark Horse released The Art of Overwatch on October 24, 2017. The 100-page book showcased concept art and illustrations from Overwatchs development team, accompanied by their commentary. 

In 2019, Blizzard released Bastet, What You Left Behind, and Valkyrie, three short stories which centered on Soldier: 76, Baptiste, and Mercy, respectively. Further short stories featuring Symmetra and Reaper have also been released. Also in 2019, Blizzard released an official Overwatch cookbook. 

On June 2, 2020, The Hero of Numbani, a young-adult novel by Nicky Drayden was published. The story, functioning as a loose novelization of Orisa's origin story, follows Efi Ofadele, an 11-year old inventor. Ofadele creates Orisa in order to help protect the fictional country of Numbani. A second Overwatch young-adult novel, this time authored by Lyndsay Ely, was released on June 1, 2021. The novel, titled Deadlock Rebels, centered on Cassidy and Ashe during their teenage years.

Merchandise
The popularity of Overwatch led various companies to launch merchandise lines featuring its characters. Funko produced several figurines as part of their "Pop!" line. Tracer is featured prominently in Good Smile Company's merchandise, with the company distributing both Nendoroid and Figma figurines of the character. Good Smile has also featured other Overwatch characters in their lines. LEGO has also produced an Overwatch set of figurines. As part of their Rivals line, Nerf has designed Overwatch-stylized toy guns. Nerf's parent company, Hasbro, later launched a set of action figures featuring Overwatch characters.

Reception

The original Overwatch achieved widespread acclaim from both critics and players both prior to and upon release. Pre-release, media outlets "rushed to cover the [game's] beta", which attracted over 9.7 million players.

The game's PC, PS4, and Xbox One versions all received "universal acclaim", according to review aggregator Metacritic; these versions all hold a "metascore" of 90/100 or higher on the aggregator. Overwatchs Nintendo Switch version, however, received "mixed or average reviews" with a 73/100 metascore on the aggregator. Since its release, Overwatch has been listed by various outlets as one of the best video games of all-time, particularly within its hero shooter genre and among 21st-century contemporaries. Voted on by readers, Overwatch also ranked 29th on a 2018 Game Informer poll regarding the best video games-all. Critics praised Overwatch for its friendly and inclusive multiplayer atmosphere, able to appeal to new and casual players, as well as more competitive and expert players. The game's colorful and vibrant world and characters, in addition to the playful and team-based nature of its gameplay were cited as driving forces behind the inclusivity and positivity of its player base. While this broad accessibility was a common account by reviewers upon release, outlets later noted that players grew more toxic, particularly on the game's competitive mode. Kaplan concurred with this assessment and led the developers' efforts to curb this toxicity.

The game also experienced considerable commercial success, becoming the 7th-best selling video game of all-time. Although never officially disclosing an exact number of sold copies, Blizzard counted a lifetime total of over 60 million players in 2021. In 2022, Bloomberg published a report stating that the game eventually sold over 50 million copies. Fans of the franchise produced a large amount of content including art, cosplay, fan fiction, anime-influenced music videos, Internet memes, and pornography featuring Overwatch characters and elements. 

Prior to Overwatch 2s release, fans raised concerns over the sequel's transition toward a 5v5 dynamic. Also predating its release, the sequel attracted both critic and player concerns about whether it would feel like a true sequel with considerable differences from its predecessor. Visuals from the sequel's technical beta were criticized for being too similar to the original game's. A perceived lack of attention toward support players was also noted during the game's beta. In response, Blizzard made efforts to make the support role more enticing to play. Shortly following the sequel's beta period and just weeks prior the game launching into its early access, Kiriko was introduced to the game's playable roster as the first support hero announced in over three years. 

Overwatch 2 was met with positive reception from critics, albeit less so than its predecessor; the game's PC version holds an 79/100 metascore on review aggregator Metacritic. All versions indicate "generally favorable reviews. Some reviewers reaffirmed the game's questionable status as a true sequel, likening the game to more of a remix or update. Players had a more lukewarm reception to the sequel upon its launch, with criticism aimed at its battle pass feature and its formerly-required "SMS Protect" system. Changes made to online character bios following the launch of Overwatch 2 received criticism from fans. 

While the original game was positively received, elements of its related media garnered some criticism. Writing for Polygon in 2022, Cass Marshall wrote that "Overwatchs lore has been in stasis for so long, and its fandom has been so willing to make a meal out of the crumbs sprinkled out over the years, that I feel like the fans' version of the cast is more concrete than the actual canon." Natalie Clayton, writing for PC Gamer similarly opined that "Overwatch has only felt more stagnant as the years go on," as a result of the series' narrative being "almost uniformly backstories, developments happening safely in the past." Clayton added that "relationships never developed or changed. Characters never grew, and the state of the world-at-large was left a static unknown." Marshall cited this lack of significant progression in Overwatch lore, as well as Blizzard's inconsistent updates to it, particularly from 2018 to 2022, as a factor behind the game's declined in popularity. Valorant, Rainbow Six Siege, and Apex Legends were all cited as gaining favor among existing Overwatch players. Developments in Overwatch media also affected in-game player patterns; after Soldier: 76 was canonically revealed to be gay in a comic, his pick rate among players dropped dramatically.

Notes

References

Sources

External links
Overwatch – Comics & Short Stories

 
Activision Blizzard franchises
Artificial intelligence in fiction
Esports games
Fictional organizations in comics
First-person shooters by series
Multiplayer online games
Video game franchises introduced in 2016
Video games adapted into comics
Video games adapted into novels
Works about the United Nations